This page gathers the results of elections in Tuscany.

Regional elections

Latest regional election

In the latest regional election, which took place on 20–21 September 2020, Eugenio Giani of the Democratic Party (PD) was elected president, by beating Susanna Ceccardi of Lega Nord 48.6% to 40.5%. The PD was by far the largest party with 34% of the vote.

List of previous regional elections
1970 Tuscan regional election
1975 Tuscan regional election
1980 Tuscan regional election
1985 Tuscan regional election
1990 Tuscan regional election
1995 Tuscan regional election
2000 Tuscan regional election
2005 Tuscan regional election
2010 Tuscan regional election
2015 Tuscan regional election

 
Politics of Tuscany